Keiren Westwood (born 23 October 1984) is a professional footballer who last played as a goalkeeper for Queens Park Rangers. Born in England, he played international football for the Republic of Ireland.

Club career

Manchester City
Westwood was born in Manchester. He started his career at Fletcher Moss Rangers, he then moved onto Manchester City. He never played a first team game and was released as he was understudy to David James and Nicky Weaver. Weeks before his release he had broken his hand while on loan at Oldham Athletic. He then had unsuccessful trials at Bradford City and Accrington Stanley.

Carlisle United
Westwood then joined Carlisle United, becoming the understudy to Matt Glennon. Although he played in most cup games, in March 2005, when Glennon was injured, Westwood played some Conference games for Carlisle before being replaced by the fit-again Glennon.

In the 2005–06 season, Glennon left Carlisle and they signed Anthony Williams as his replacement. It looked like Westwood would be the club's number two goalkeeper again, though he finally got his chance to compete for the number one shirt and he succeeded in taking his chance. He started 35 League Two games in their title season and continued to be the club's number one goalkeeper. At the end of the 2007–08 season in League One, Westwood was named in the PFA Team of the Year and also won all of the club's Player of the Season awards.

Coventry City
On 18 June 2008, Westwood signed a three-year contract with Championship club Coventry City for an undisclosed fee. He was named in the Championship PFA Team of the Year for 2009 in his debut season at the club. He won the club's player of the year award for the 2009–10 season.

Sunderland
It was confirmed on 22 June 2011 that Westwood would join Sunderland on 1 July on a free transfer. He made his first start for Sunderland on 23 August in the League Cup defeat to Brighton & Hove Albion. His first Premier League appearance came against Aston Villa on 29 October, when he was brought on to replace the injured Simon Mignolet. Westwood later denied former Sunderland striker Darren Bent a goal after the striker was through one on one, with the game level at 1–1. In the following game, away to Manchester United, Westwood made a 'magnificent double save' to deny Wayne Rooney and Patrice Evra, but United won 1–0. Despite Sunderland struggling for results, which saw Steve Bruce sacked on 30 November, Westwood remained in good form. However, after missing Sunderland's 1–0 victory over Manchester City on New Year's Day 2012, Westwood found himself second choice to Mignolet for the remainder of the season. 

Westwood remained behind Mignolet in the pecking order at the start of the 2012–13 season, with the Belgian playing in Sunderland's first two league games, although Westwood did play in Sunderland's League Cup victories over Morecambe and Milton Keynes Dons before a 1 – 0 defeat to Middlesbrough in the fourth round, a game in which Westwood also played. Following Mignolet's departure to Liverpool at the end of the season, Westwood regained his place as Sunderland's first choice keeper, with competition now coming from Vito Mannone.

At the end of 2013–14 season, he was released by the club.

Sheffield Wednesday
On 7 July 2014, Westwood signed for Championship club Sheffield Wednesday on a two-year deal.

At the end of the 2014–15 season, Westwood was named in the 2014–15 Championship PFA Team of the Year.

In July 2019 he signed a new two-year contract with the club.

Westwood is one of only three players to have won the Sheffield Wednesday F.C. Player of the Year award on multiple occasions, the others being Eric Potts and Barry Bannan. He has received the award twice, at the end of the 2014–15 and 2016–17 seasons.

On 20 May 2021 it was announced that he would leave Sheffield Wednesday at the end of the season, following the expiry of his contract.

Queens Park Rangers
On 18 March 2022, Westwood joined Queens Park Rangers until the end of the season.

International career
Westwood was eligible to represent his native England and the Republic of Ireland because his grandparents had emigrated to Manchester from Wexford.
On 17 May 2009, Westwood was called up by the Republic of Ireland to attend their training camp in Portugal after impressing against Leeds United in a League One match. Three days later he played as a second-half substitute in a practice match against Portuguese club Lagos, replacing Joe Murphy after 66 minutes. On 29 May 2009, Westwood made his first appearance for Ireland in a friendly against Nigeria. He played in the friendly match with South Africa in Thomond Park on 8 September 2009. On 26 March 2011, Westwood made his competitive debut in a European Championship qualifier with Macedonia. He made a crucial save in the closing minutes of the match.

Westwood was part of the Ireland squad for UEFA Euro 2012, although he did not feature in any games. Following the retirement from internationals by Shay Given after Euro 2012, Westwood assumed the No.1 position for his country. He later lost this place to David Forde. He made his 15th appearance for Ireland on 2 June 2013, in a 4–0 win over Georgia.

In 2015; following a number of injuries which ruled him out of previous squads, Westwood was recalled to the Starting XI for Ireland's post-season friendly fixture versus England in Dublin, Westwood was replaced in the second half by Shay Given with the scores at 0–0.

He played at 2016 UEFA European Championship, where he helped the national team to reach the 1/8 European Championship for the first time.

Career statistics

Club

International

Honours
Carlisle United
Football League Two: 2005–06

Republic of Ireland
Nations Cup: 2011

Individual
PFA Team of the Year: 2007–08 League One, 2008–09 Championship, 2014–15 Championship
Carlisle United Player of the Year: 2007–08
Coventry City Player of the Year: 2009–10
Sheffield Wednesday Player of the Year: 2014–15

See also
 List of Republic of Ireland international footballers born outside the Republic of Ireland

References

External links

1984 births
Living people
Footballers from Manchester
English footballers
Republic of Ireland association footballers
Republic of Ireland international footballers
Association football goalkeepers
Fletcher Moss Rangers F.C. players
Manchester City F.C. players
Oldham Athletic A.F.C. players
Carlisle United F.C. players
Coventry City F.C. players
Sunderland A.F.C. players
Sheffield Wednesday F.C. players
Queens Park Rangers F.C. players
National League (English football) players
English Football League players
Premier League players
UEFA Euro 2012 players
UEFA Euro 2016 players
English people of Irish descent